Gary Conklin is an independent American filmmaker based in Los Angeles, California.

Conklin works predominantly in the documentary genre.  His films focus on cultural icons of the 20th century.  Subjects have included the late American writer and composer Paul Bowles, in Paul Bowles in Morocco, which is as much about the North African country as it is about Bowles; Gore Vidal while running for U.S. Senate in 1982; the American painter Edward Ruscha, and the Mexican painter Rufino Tamayo.

Conklin produced and directed Memories of Berlin: The Twilight of Weimar Culture. The film features interviews with Christopher Isherwood, Louise Brooks, and Arthur Koestler, among others, discussing the culturally significant period of the 1920s in Berlin, during the Weimar Republic. He also has produced and directed a documentary about English literary society during the period after World War I until World War II, which includes Stephen Spender, Anthony Powell, Harold Acton, James Lees-Milne, Peter Quennell, Christopher Isherwood, and Diana Mosley.  Conklin also made Notes from Under the Volcano about John Huston's making of the film Under the Volcano.

Filmography 
As Producer & Director:
Paul Bowles in Morocco (1970)
Rufino Tamayo: The Sources of his Art (1972)
Memories of Berlin: The Twilight of Weimar Culture (1976)
L.A. Suggested by the Art of Ed Ruscha (1981)
Gore Vidal: The Man Who Said No (1983)
Notes from Under the Volcano (1984)
A Question of Class (1992)
Veracruz, El Espíritu Jarocho (1998)

External links

American film directors
American documentary filmmakers
American male film actors
Year of birth missing (living people)
Living people